Pisarski is a Polish language habitational surname for someone from a place called Pisary. Notable people with the name include:

 Józef Pisarski (1913–1986), Polish boxer
 Maciej Pisarski, Polish diplomat
 Roman Pisarski (1912–1969), Polish children's writer

References 

Polish-language surnames
Polish toponymic surnames